The Reber Plan was a late 1940s plan to fill in parts of the San Francisco Bay. It was designed and advocated by John Reber—an actor, theatrical producer, and schoolteacher.

San Francisco Bay Project
Under the plan, which was also known as the San Francisco Bay Project, the mouth of the Sacramento River (from Suisun Bay) would be channelized by dams and would feed two vast freshwater lakes within the bay, providing drinking and irrigation water to the residents and farmers of the Bay Area. The barriers would support rail and highway traffic and would create the two freshwater lakes. West of the channel would be airports, a naval base, and a pair of locks comparable in size to those of the Panama Canal. Industrial plants would be developed on the east.

The San Francisco Chronicle endorsed the plan's concept of a causeway to replace or supplement the San Francisco Bay Bridge, stating:

Feasibility tested
In 1953 the U.S. Army Corps of Engineers recommended more detailed study of the plan and eventually constructed a hydraulic model of the Bay Area to test it. The barriers, which were the plan's essential element, failed to survive this critical study. The scrapping of the Reber Plan in the early 1960s was one sign, perhaps, of the end of an era of grandiose civil works projects aimed at totally restructuring a region's natural environment, and the birth of the environmental era.

See also 
Atlantropa
Salt Water Barrier (Delaware River)

References

External links
 
 

History of the San Francisco Bay Area
San Francisco Bay